Albus may refer to: 

Albus (surname) 
 Albinus (cognomen), or Albus, a Latin surname 
 Albus (coin), groschen coin of the Holy Roman Empire
 Albus, a Geomantic figure
 'Albus', a cultivar of Rosemary

Entertainment 
 Albus Dumbledore, a fictional character from J.K. Rowling's Harry Potter series 
Albus Severus Potter, Harry and Ginny's second-born child
 Albus, a character from the game Castlevania: Order of Ecclesia

See also
 Alba (disambiguation)
 Album (disambiguation)
 Albus Cavus, an American art collective
 Tundra wolf, (Canis lupus albus)
 Pied crow, (Corvus albus)